Though Persia/Iran had never been a Christian country, Christianity had enough of an impact on Persia and Persians to produce a considerable number of saints of this origin, at various times in the Church's history – some of them travelling far afield from their native country, such as Saint Ivo of Huntingdonshire who got his fame as a hermit in England.

List 
 Abda and Abdisho
 Abdecalas
 Abdon and Sennen
 Abrosima
 Acacius of Amida
 Acepsimas of Hnaita
 Ajabel
 Anastasius of Persia
 Asyncritus of Hyrcania
 Bademus
 Barhadbesciabas
 Saint Benjamin the Deacon and Martyr
 Christina of Persia
 Daniel and Verda
 Ishoʿsabran
 James Intercisus
 Mambeca
 Mana of Bet-Parsaje
 Saint Mari
 Maris, Martha, Abachum and Audifax
 Maruthas
 Quiricus and Julietta
 Sapor of Bet-Nicator
 Simon of Bet-Titta
 Veeda of Bakh
 Zanitas and Lazarus of Persia

See also

Martyrs of Persia under Shapur II

Modern Times 

In modern times, some with connections to Iran have been proposed for canonization.  Among these are:

 Servants of God Ibrahim Addai Scher (d. 1918) and 27 Companion Martyrs of the Assyrian-Chaldean-Syriac Genocide (d. 1915-18), Archeparchs, Eparchs, Priests, Catechumens, and Laypersons of the Archeparchy of Urmia; Priests of the Congregation of the Mission (Vincentians); Martyrs (Iraq-Iran)

References

 
 
Persia
Saints
Saints